ISO/IEC JTC 1/SC 40 IT Service Management and IT Governance is a standardization subcommittee of the Joint Technical Committee ISO/IEC JTC 1 of the International Organization for Standardization (ISO) and the International Electrotechnical Commission (IEC). ISO/IEC JTC 1/SC 40 develops and facilitates the development of international standards, technical reports, and technical specifications within the fields of IT service management and IT governance, with a focus in IT activity such as audit, digital forensics, governance, risk management, outsourcing, service operations and service maintenance. The international secretariat of ISO/IEC JTC 1/SC 40 is Standards Australia (SA), located in Australia.

History
ISO/IEC JTC 1/SC 40 was formed at the November 2013, 28th JTC 1 Plenary held in Perros-Guirec, France. The subcommittee was established via Resolution 21 from this meeting, and its scope, secretariat, and possible liaisons determined. The new subcommittee combines the work of ISO/IEC JTC 1/WG 8 Governance of IT, ISO/IEC JTC 1/SC 7/WG 25 IT service management, and ISO/IEC JTC 1/SC 7/WG 27 IT enabled services/BPO (ITES/BPO).

Scope
The scope of ISO/IEC JTC 1/SC 40 is:

"Standardization of IT Service Management and IT Governance"

Develop standards, tools, frameworks, best practices and related documents for IT Service Management and IT Governance, including areas of IT activity such as audit, digital forensics, governance, risk management, outsourcing, service operations and service maintenance, but excluding subject matter covered under the scope and existing work programs of JTC 1/SC 27 and JTC 1/SC 38.

The work will initially cover:

Governance of IT, including the development of the ISO/IEC 38500 series standards and related documents.
Operational aspects of Governance of IT, including ISO/IEC 30121 Information Technology — Governance of digital forensic risk framework, and interfaces with the management of IT as well as the role of governance in the area of business innovation.
All aspects relating to IT service management, including the development of the ISO/IEC 20000 series standards and related documents.
All aspects relating to IT-Enabled Services — Business Process Outsourcing, including the development of the ISO/IEC 30105 series standards and related documents.

Structure
ISO/IEC JTC 1/SC 40 is made up of three working groups (WGs), three study groups (SGs), and one advisory group (AG), each of which carries out specific tasks in standards development within the field of IT Service Management and IT Governance. The focus of each working group is described in the group’s terms of reference. The working groups, study groups, and advisory group of ISO/IEC JTC 1/SC 40 are:

Collaborations
ISO/IEC JTC 1/SC 40 works in close collaboration with a number of other organizations or subcommittees, both internal and external to ISO or IEC, in order to avoid conflicting or duplicative work. Organizations internal to ISO or IEC that collaborate with or are in liaison to ISO/IEC JTC 1/SC 40 include:
 ISO/IEC JTC 1/SC 7, Software and systems engineering
 ISO/IEC JTC 1/SC 27, IT security techniques
 ISO/IEC JTC 1/SC 38, Distributed application platforms and services (DAPS)
 ISO/TC 171, Document management applications
 ISO/TC 258, Project, programme and portfolio management
 ISO/PC 259, Outsourcing

Organizations external to ISO or IEC that collaborate with or are in liaison to ISO/IEC JTC 1/SC 40 include:
 Institute of Electrical and Electronics Engineers (IEEE)
 Information Systems Audit and Control Association (ISACA)
 Organization for the Advancement of Structured Information Standards (OASIS)
 The IT Service Management Forum International Limited (itSMFI)
 International Accreditation Forum (IAF)

Member countries
Countries pay a fee to ISO to be members of subcommittees.

The 28 "P" (participating) members of ISO/IEC JTC 1/SC 40 are: Australia, Brazil, Canada, China, Côte d'Ivoire, Denmark, Finland, France, Germany, India, Italy, Japan, Republic of Korea, Luxembourg, Netherlands, New Zealand, Peru, Poland, Portugal, Romania, Russian Federation, Rwanda, Singapore, South Africa, Spain, Sweden, United Kingdom, and United States of America

The 10 "O" (observing) members of ISO/IEC JTC 1/SC 40 are: Argentina, Austria, Belgium, Czech Republic, Hong Kong, Islamic Republic of Iran, Ireland, Kenya, Switzerland, and Uruguay.

Standards
ISO/IEC JTC 1/SC 40 currently has 11 published standards, as well as various other standards or technical reports under development within the field of IT service-management and IT governance. These include:

See also
 ISO/IEC JTC 1
 List of ISO standards
 Standards Australia
 International Organization for Standardization
 International Electrotechnical Commission

References

External links 
 ISO/IEC JTC 1/SC 40 page at ISO

040
Information technology management